There are several lakes named Mud Lake within the U.S. state of Arkansas.

 Mud Lake, Arkansas County, Arkansas.	
 Mud Lake, Arkansas County, Arkansas.	
 Mud Lake, Arkansas County, Arkansas.	
 Mud Lake, Ashley County, Arkansas.		
 Mud Lake, Calhoun County, Arkansas.		
 Mud Lake, Chicot County, Arkansas.		
 Mud Lake, Desha County, Arkansas.		
 Mud Lake, Hempstead County, Arkansas.	
 Mud Lake, Jefferson County, Arkansas.	
 Mud Lake, Lincoln County, Arkansas.		
 Mud Lake, Monroe County, Arkansas.		
 Mud Lake, Monroe County, Arkansas.		
 Mud Lake, St. Francis County, Arkansas.	
 Mud Lake, Union County, Arkansas.		
 Mud Lake, Woodruff County, Arkansas.

References
 USGS-U.S. Board on Geographic Names

Lakes of Arkansas